Linda Evans (born 1942) is an American actress.

Linda Evans may also refer to:

Linda Evans (radical) (born 1947), American activist
Linda Evans (author) (born 1958), American science fiction writer
Linda Evans (bowls), Welsh international lawn bowler